Epipagis is a genus of moths of the family Crambidae described by Jacob Hübner in 1825.

Species
Epipagis algarrobolis (Schaus, 1940)
Epipagis citrinalis (Hampson, 1899)
Epipagis disparilis (Dyar, 1910)
Epipagis fenestralis Hübner, 1796
Epipagis flavispila (Hampson, 1913)
Epipagis forsythae Munroe, 1955
Epipagis lygialis (Snellen, 1899)
Epipagis peritalis (Walker, 1859)
Epipagis polythliptalis (Hampson, 1899)
Epipagis quadriserialis (Pagenstecher, 1907)
Epipagis roseocinctalis (Hampson, 1913)
Epipagis setinalis Hampson, 1918
Epipagis triserialis Pagenstecher, 1907
Epipagis tristalis (Kenrick, 1907)
Epipagis zinghalis (Walker, 1859)

Former species
Epipagis cancellalis (Zeller, 1852)
Epipagis ocellata (Hampson in Poulton, 1916)
Epipagis prolalis Viette & Legrand, 1958
Epipagis strigiferalis (Hampson, 1900)
Epipagis vespertinalis (Saalmüller, 1880)

References

Spilomelinae
Crambidae genera
Taxa named by Jacob Hübner